The 1932–33 season was the Fussball Club Basel 1893's 40th season in their existence and their 33rd consecutive season in the top flight of Swiss football. They played their home games in the Landhof in the district Wettstein in Kleinbasel. The club's chairman Franz Rinderer was confirmed at the AGM for the second consecutive period.

Overview 
At the beginning of the season the Austrian former international Karl Kurz was appointed as new head coach. The previous season Kunz had been head coach for FC Grenchen. He took over as club trainer from player-manager Otto Haftl who continued with the team as player. Basel played a total of 39 matches in their 1932–33 season. 15 of these matches were in the domestic league Nationalliga, seven in the Challenge National, six matches in the Swiss Cup and 11 matches were friendlies. Of these 11 friendly matches seven were played in the Landhof, two other games were also played in Switzerland and two were played in a tournament in Luxembourg. Of the friendly games, six games ended with a victory, one was drawn and four matches ended with a defeat. The team scored 42 goals and conceded 27.

In the middle of 36th National championships there was an intermediate championship called Challenge National (Championnat intermédiaire). The competition participants were divided into two groups, with encounters between the two groups taking place among themselves. The winners of both groups were to play the final. The games were played in the winter months between November and February. Basel were allocated to group 1 Basel and finished in fifth position, however the away match against Blue Stars Zürich was not played. Basel won three of their seven games drawing and losing twice. Group 1 was won by Grasshopper Club but the Challenge National championship was won by the BSC Young Boys.

Same situation as the previous season in the 36th Swiss championship 1932–33 Nationalliga was also divided into two groups. This year with eight teams in each group, coming from the whole of Switzerland and no longer just regional groups. The top team in each group would advance to the finals. The two second placed teams would have a play-off to decide the third final place and, same curiosity as the previous season, the second tier champions would also qualify to the finals. In this competition the teams played a double round robin. In the first stage the games were played between August and November the remaining between February and May. Basel were allocated to Group 1 and finished in second position in the table, with seven victories and four draws from 14 games. With 18 points they were five behind group winner Grasshopper Club who advanced with group 2 winners Young Boys to the finals. Etoile Carouge finished in last position in the group and suffered relegation. Second tier (1st League) champions were FC Bern and they also advanced to the finals. The cross-over play-off game between the second placed teams from each group was played in Basel in the Stadion Rankhof. But Basel lost 3–4 against Servette, despite the fact that Otto Haftl scored a hat-trick. As last team Servette advanced to the finals, which they finished level on points with Grasshoppers. Servette won the play-off match between these two teams and became champions.

In the Swiss Cup first round Basel were drawn at home in the Landhof against local team Concordia Basel, who in the meantime had been relegated to the third highest league. Basel won 4–2 and advanced to the next round. They played and won 3–0 at home against Blue Stars Zürich. In the third round Basel played away against AC Bellinzona and won 2–3 after extra time. The quarter-final was played at home against Lugano and was won 4–2. In the semi-final Basel were drawn with a home match against Lausanne-Sport. In another high scoring game Basel managed a 5–3 victory. Basel advanced to the Final, which was played in the Hardturm in Zürich. Twice Haftl, once Jaeck and once Walter Müller scored the goals as Basel won the final 4–3. This was their first ever national title, apart from the Anglo-Cup in 1913 which was a forerunner to the Swiss Cup.

The team scored 91 goals, excluding the friendly games, and conceded 62. Haftl was the teams top goal scorer, 17 in the league, 4 in the intermediate and 7 in the cup, in total 28 goals. Ferdinand Wesely was second best goal scorer, 9 in the league, 2 in the intermediate and 7 in the cup, in total 16 goals. Equal third were Alfred Jaeck (4/8/3) and Ernst Hufschmid (10/2/3) both with 15 goals.

Players 
The following is the list of the Basel first team squad during the season 1932–33. The list includes players that were in the squad the day the season started on 7 August 1932 but subsequently left the club after that date.

Results

Legend

Friendly matches

Pre-season

Winter break to end of season

Challenge National

Group 1 matches

League table

Nationalliga

Group 1 matches

League table

Play-off

Swiss Cup

See also
 History of FC Basel
 List of FC Basel players
 List of FC Basel seasons

References

Sources 
 Rotblau: Jahrbuch Saison 2014/2015. Publisher: FC Basel Marketing AG. 
 Die ersten 125 Jahre. Publisher: Josef Zindel im Friedrich Reinhardt Verlag, Basel. 
 FCB team 1932–33 at fcb-archiv.ch
 Übersicht bei RSSSF

External links
 FC Basel official site

FC Basel seasons
Basel